El Debate de Culiacán is a Mexican newspaper published by El Debate S.A. de C.V. of Culiacán, Sinaloa.

Fernando Brito, a photographic editor of El Debate, gave a speech at the "Crónicas: Seven Contemporary Mexican Artists Confront the Drug War" exhibit in Houston, Texas.

References

External links

 El Debate 

Mass media in Culiacán
Newspapers published in Mexico
Publications with year of establishment missing
Spanish-language newspapers